Syed Allauddin Hyder also known as Maulvi Allauddin was a preacher and Imam of Makkah Masjid, Hyderabad, India. He is popularly known for leading an attack at British Residency on 17 July 1857 located in the princely state of Hyderabad. The attack took place during the Indian Rebellion of 1857. He is considered as the first prisoner to be sentenced and deported to Cellular Jail (also known as Kaala pani) in the Andaman and Nicobar islands.

Early life

Attack on the residency
On July 17 about 500 people led by Maulvi Allauddin and Turrebaz Khan took out a protest march from Mecca Masjid to the British Residency. The protesters turned violent and attacked the residency. The British forces opened fire. The protesters sustained a counter-attack for a few hours but had to retreat thereafter. Turrebaz Khan was arrested, while Maulvi Alauddin managed to flee.

He was captured and transferred to the Cellular Jail. He was sent out of Hyderabad on 28th June 1859.

Imprisonment and final years 
The Maulvi's right hand had been paralysed owing to a gunshot wound during the attack on the residency. He had also suffered sword wounds on his shoulder and forehead. The Maulvi made repeated requests to be released on basis of poor health and good conduct, but these were rejected. He died sometime in 1889.

References

Further reading
 
 Life in Kala Pani, by;Francis Xavier Neelam
 The Unwept and Unsung Heroes of Telangana, by; Dr. L. Panduranga Reddy
 The Freedom Struggle in Hyderabad: 1857-1885, by; Hyderabad State Committee-1956.

Indian  people of the Indian Rebellion of 1857
People from Hyderabad State
Prisoners and detainees of British India
1824 births
Year of death missing